BIPU (Bioremediation Infield Personnel Unit) is a sanitation method suitable for disaster relief and for temporary or isolated locations. It consists of flat-packed plastic panels which fit together to make a box, which is buried in the ground, and a large plastic bag to be placed inside the box. It is quick to set up but also suitable for longer term use if required.

A latrine, (Western style, or squat style) pour-flush latrine, is placed over the top. The S-shaped water seal improves hygiene, compared to pit latrines.

Background
The BIPU is manufactured and distributed by Poly Marketing Pty Limited.

See also
Appropriate technology

External links
BiPu - New Inventors TV program
Certificate of Authorisation for use in Tasmania.

Appropriate technology
Disaster management tools
Sewerage